The  was the first fragmentation hand grenade designed and deployed by the Imperial Japanese Army.

History and development
After the Russo-Japanese War of 1904–1905, the Japanese army experimented with a variety of grenades; however, no design reached mass production. Japanese military observers in the European front of World War I noted the technical development and tactical application of hand grenades as infantry support weapons with considerable interest, and the Army technical bureau was tasked with a project to develop a grenade launcher that could be used in combination with the Type 38 rifle, the Japanese Army's standard infantry weapon. The project failed for a variety of reasons, including too small a bore, too long a gun barrel and difficulties with a propellant. The technical bureau then turned to a World War I-vintage German design for a small signal mortar, which was developed into the stand-alone Type 10 grenade discharger. The Type 10 grenade was designed for use with this grenade launcher when attached to a base containing a primer and propellant charge. It could also be thrown by hand, or fired from a rifle grenade launcher with a tail assembly added.

Design
The design of the Type 10 grenade was almost identical to the later Type 91 with a grooved, "pineapple-shaped", segmented body designed to disperse sharp fragments when it exploded. The main difference was the Type 10's serrated top. A threaded socket in the bottom of the body allowed for the attachment of an auxiliary propellant canister for use in a grenade launcher, or a finned tail assembly for use as a rifle grenade. The fuse was a percussion-activated delay type, initiated by pulling out a safety pin and striking the top of the cap, which gave a 7–8 second delay. When used as a rifle grenade or mortar round, the fuse activated automatically, as the plunger was pushed in by the force of the launch. One issue with the design was the highly variable and inaccurate fuse timing, which resulted either in premature explosion, or such a long delay that the recipient could hurl the grenade back prior to detonation.

Combat record
The Type 10 grenade was quickly superseded in front-line combat service by the Type 91 grenade, and survived into the Second Sino-Japanese War and World War II primarily in the form of flare shells and signal shells.

References

External links
Type 10 Grenade
US Technical Manual E 30-480

Notes

1
21
Rifle grenades
Fragmentation grenades
Hand grenades of Japan